The Big Wave is a 1948 novel by Pearl S. Buck. She won the 1948 Child Study Association's Children's Book Award (now Bank Street Children's Book Committee's Josette Frank Award) for The Big Wave. The book contains illustrations from Utagawa Hiroshige and Katsushika Hokusai.

Plot
Kino lives with his family on a farm on the side of a mountain in Japan while his friend, Jiya, lives in the fishing village below. Though everyone in the area has heard of the big wave no one suspects that when the next one comes, it will wipe out Jiya's entire family and fishing village below the mountain. Jiya soon must leave his family behind in order to keep the fisherman traditions alive.

Jiya, now orphaned, struggles to overcome his sadness and is adopted into Kino's family.  He and Kino live like brothers and Jiya takes on the life of a farmer.  Even when the wise Old Gentleman offers Jiya a wealthy life at his rich castle, Jiya refuses. Though Jiya is able to find happiness again in his adopted family, particularly with Kino's younger sister, Setsu, Jiya wishes to live as a fisherman again as he comes of age.

When Jiya tells Kino that he wishes to marry Setsu and return to the fishing village, Kino fears that Jiya and Setsu will suffer and it is safer for them to remain on the mountain as a farmer, thinking of the potential consequences should another big wave come. However, Jiya reveals his understanding that it is in the presence of danger that one learns to be brave, and to appreciate how wonderful life can be.

Adaptations 
Pearl S. Buck worked with Tad Danielewski to develop the script for television (1956), and the show played successfully to critics. Buck also worked closely on the film version, The Big Wave (1961) which Danielewski directed. The film starred Sessue Hayakawa, Mickey Curtis, and Juzo Itami. Singer Judy Ongg also appeared in the film.

References 
Citations

Bibliography

 
 

1948 American novels
American novels adapted into films
American novels adapted into television shows
Novels by Pearl S. Buck
Novels set in Japan
Japan in non-Japanese culture
John Day Company books
American children's novels
1948 children's books
Novels about natural disasters
American novellas